North American fraternity and sorority housing refers largely to the houses or housing areas in which fraternity and sorority members live and work together.  In addition to serving as housing, fraternity and sorority housing may also serve to host social gatherings, meetings, and functions that benefit the community.

History 
The first fraternity house seems to have been located at Alpha Epsilon of Chi Psi at the University of Michigan around 1846.  As fraternity membership was punishable by expulsion at many colleges at this time, the house was located deep in the woods.

Fraternity chapter housing initially existed in two forms: lodges that served as meeting rooms and houses that had boarding rooms.
The lodges came first and were largely replaced by houses with living accommodations.  Lodges were often no more than rented rooms above stores or taverns.  The idea of substantial fraternity housing caught on quickly, but was accomplished with much greater ease in the North as southern college students had far less available money for construction.
The first fraternity house in the South was likely one rented by members of Beta Theta Pi at Hampden–Sydney College from at least 1856.  Alpha Tau Omega was then the first fraternity to own a house in the South when, in 1880, its chapter at The University of the South acquired one.

Early chapters of women's fraternities often rented houses where they could live together, usually with a chaperone. This was in a day before colleges and universities had housing available. The first chapter house built by a women's fraternity was the one Alpha Phi erected one at Syracuse University in 1886.

Many colleges eventually came to support fraternity and sorority housing as they allowed increased enrollment without construction of costly dormitories.  The nature of this benefit varied between campuses as some houses were paid for entirely by alumni, some were rented, and some were built on land leased from the college.  It was further recognized that, while fraternities having chapter houses did not raise academic performance, it did have a tendency to keep it from falling as the chapters could not afford (financially) to have members leaving school and no longer paying for their rooms.

The Inter-Sorority Congress of 1913 saw the establishment of uniform rules and regulations regarding life in chapter houses.

The number of houses owned by fraternities and sororities grew from 772 in 1915 to 928 in 1920.

Design

Fraternity and sorority houses range in size from three to twenty bedrooms or more. They can usually be identified by large Greek letters or flags on the front of the house. The larger houses generally have a large meeting room and/or dining room, commercial kitchen and study room. There is usually a lounge of some sort, access to which is often restricted to fully initiated members. Fraternities and sororities will also often maintain a chapter room, to which only initiates may ever be admitted and even whose existence may be kept secret. The walls of the house may be decorated with pictures of past chapter events, awards and trophies, decorative (or historic) paddles, or composite photos of members from past years.

In some fraternities or sororities, only the representatives live in the houses while in others the entire fraternity or sorority may live in the house.  Other, larger fraternities or sororities may have more than one house to accommodate all of its members.

At many colleges, Greek houses are placed on the same street which is traditionally referred to as "Greek Row."

Policies
Fraternity and sorority houses are typically owned either by a corporation of alumni, the sponsoring national organization, or the host college. For this reason, such houses may be subject to the rules of the host college, the national organization, or both.

Due to the increase in widely publicized alcohol-related deaths on college campuses, many national organizations and host colleges have implemented dry housing policies in which the consumption and possession of alcohol is prohibited on house property. Some colleges make this policy conditional on overall grade performance.

In addition to banning alcohol, many university-owned fraternity and sorority houses have smoking bans in place inside.

Because of residential requirements, some college campuses and national chapter administrations also prohibit members of the opposite sex on certain floors of fraternity and sorority houses.

Notable large chapter houses

See also

 :Category:Fraternity and sorority houses

References

Fraternity and sorority houses
House types